St. Joseph Grade School (SJGS) is a Catholic pre-K through 8 school in South Bend, St. Joseph County, Indiana, noted in particular for its historic school building, a Late Gothic Revival style tan brick building built in 1925. The school has an enrollment of 471 students, and the principal is George Azar. Beginning at the start of the 2021–2022 school year, he will be replaced by Melissa Greene.

The Congregation of Holy Cross administers the school. It is the parochial school of the Parish of St. Joseph, in the Diocese of Fort Wayne-South Bend, and the oldest Catholic congregation in the city. It bears the same name as the county and nearby river.

Architecture
The main school building is a 2½-story, "T"-plan building of tan brick on a raised basement built in 1925. It sits on a stone-clad foundation and has decorative brickwork. It features projecting entry bays with recessed gothic arched entries and a parapet with stone detailing.

It was listed on the National Register of Historic Places in 1999, one of 95 other districts, properties, and landmarks in the county.

References

External links
 

Catholic K–8 schools in the United States
School buildings on the National Register of Historic Places in Indiana
Gothic Revival architecture in Indiana
School buildings completed in 1925
Buildings and structures in South Bend, Indiana
National Register of Historic Places in St. Joseph County, Indiana
1925 establishments in Indiana